Chloritis gruneri is a species of air-breathing land snail, a terrestrial pulmonate gastropod mollusc in the family Camaenidae.

Distribution 
The type locality is unknown. Distribution include Kendari, Sulawesi.

Shell description 
The shell is large for the genus, brown, without hairs, somewhat elevated spire, umbilicated, the ends of the peristome connected with a strong, white callus bearing a more or less conspicuous tooth. The width of the shell is 34–45 mm.

References
This article incorporates CC-BY-3.0 text from the reference.

Further reading 
 Zilch A. (1966). "Die Typen und Typoide des Natur-Museums Senckenberg, 35: Mollusca, Camaenidae (5)". Archiv für Molluskenkunde 95: 293-319, pls 1-5.

Camaenidae
Gastropods described in 1845